Fabrizio Gilardi (born 1975) is a Swiss political scientist and professor of policy analysis at the University of Zurich.
He is known for his works on delegation theory, research design and policy diffusion processes.
He is a former editor of the Journal of Public Policy (2014–2019) and DeFacto (2015–2019).

Books
 Maggetti, Martino, Fabrizio Gilardi and Claudio M. Radaelli (2013), Designing Research in the Social Sciences, SAGE
 Gilardi, Fabrizio (2008), Delegation in the Regulatory State: Independent Regulatory Agencies in Western Europe, Edward Elgar 
 Braun, Dietmar and Fabrizio Gilardi (eds) (2006), Delegation in Contemporary Democracies, Routledge

References

External links
Fabrizio Gilardi

Living people
1975 births
University of Geneva alumni
University of Lausanne alumni
Academic staff of the University of Zurich
Swiss political scientists
Academics of social policy